Amerila castanea is a moth of the subfamily Arctiinae. It was described by George Hampson in 1911. It is found in Nigeria.

References

Endemic fauna of Nigeria
Moths described in 1911
Amerilini
Insects of West Africa
Moths of Africa